Cofan or Cofán may refer to:

 Cofán people, an ethnic group of Ecuador and Colombia
 Cofán language, their language

See also 
 Kofan (disambiguation)

Language and nationality disambiguation pages